Bard-e Fateh (also Romanized as Bard-e Fāteḩ and Bardeh-ye Fāteḩ) is a village in Zaz-e Gharbi Rural District, Zaz va Mahru District, Aligudarz County, Lorestan Province, Iran. At the 2006 census, its population was 49, in 8 families.

References 

Towns and villages in Aligudarz County